Krishna Prasad Bhattarai (Nepali: कृष्णप्रसाद भट्टराई; 13 December 19244 March 2011) also known as Kishunji was a Nepalese political leader. He was one of the main leaders involved in transitioning Nepal from an absolute monarchy to a democratic multi-party system.

Bhattarai became Prime Minister of Nepal in April 1990 after a popular democratic movement referred as Jana-Andolan.

Bhattarai was twice the Prime Minister of Nepal, once heading the Interim Government from 19 April 1990 to 26 May 1991, and then as elected Prime Minister from 31 May 1999 to 22 March 2000.

Bhattarai was the officiating President of the Nepali Congress for nearly 26 years from 12 February 1976, and was elected to the post of president of party in 1988 till 1992. He participated in the democratic movement of Nepal from its inception. The Constitution of Nepal (1990) was promulgated while he was interim Prime Minister and he was credited for successfully holding the parliamentary election in 1990, a milestone in Nepalese political history.

Youth
In his youth, Bhattarai was a journalist. He was also one of the foreign journalists to interview the General Secretary of the Communist Party of the Soviet Union, Nikita Khrushchev.

First democratic movement of Nepal

Bhattarai had participated in a long struggle to modernize the Nepalese political system, aiming to transform a society that was isolated for centuries from the outside world.

He started politics to end the 104-year-rule of the Rana Dynasty. During the political movement of 1950 to overthrow the Rana autocracy, initiated by the Bairgania Conference of the Nepali Congress on 26–27 September 1950 (Ashvin 10–11, 2007 BS), he was in charge of armed group Congress Mukti Sena fighting in Gorkha district. This armed struggle was initiated by the Nepali Congress, of which he was founding member. The armed revolution by the Nepali Congress was supported by King Tribhuvan, who was in exile, and by Indian and Burmese socialists. The armed revolution ultimately brought an end to the 104-year-rule of the Rana Dynasty on 18 February 1951 (Falgun 7, 2007 BS). This day is celebrated as Democracy Day and is a public holiday in Nepal.

After the first parliamentary election of 1959, at the age of 36, he became Speaker of lower house of parliament, though he was not an elected member. After the coup of 1960, Bhattarai was held without trial for eight years at the Sundarijal Military Detention Camp.

Bhattarai was nominated as the officiating President of the Nepali Congress on 12 February 1976 (Falgun 1, 2025 BS) by then party supremo Jananayak BP Koirala. He held this post for more than 25 years, during which time he was a key figure in Nepal's democratic movement. He was elected President of the Nepali Congress by the Eighth National Conference of the Nepali Congress, held in January 1992 (Falgun 2049 B S).

Interim government after democratic movement of 1990s
Bhattarai was the Prime Minister of the Interim Government after the 1990 People's Movement/Jana Andolan which brought democracy to the country, bringing an end to the 30-year-old Panchayati government, and to absolute monarchy in Nepal.

Bhattarai transformed the country from an absolute monarchy to a multi-party democracy without any major problems. He was prime minister when the constitution (1990) of Nepal was promulgated and successfully held the first multi-party election in 30 years. He was a popular leader but lost the election by a very narrow margin.

He again served as Prime Minister from May 1999 to March 2000. He also held the portfolio of foreign ministry from 1990 to 1991 and briefly during 1999 while he was prime minister. He was a founding member and former president of the Nepali Congress Party.

Family and personal life
His ancestor family is from politically influential Gorkha district. It is the same district that later brought Ex-PM Baburam Bhattarai to the politics. He never married.

Kishunji was a Hindu Brahmin and was very fond of reciting Bhagvad Gita. He was religious, saintly and adhered firm beliefs, for which he was called Sant (virtuous) by the public.

Party politics
Until recently, both factions of the Nepali Congress, the Nepali Congress led by Girija Prasad Koirala and the Nepali Congress (Democratic) led by Sher Bahadur Deuba claimed Bhattarai on their side though his sympathy was more with Deuba from the beginning. Both congress parties elected him as Maha Samiti Member (General Convention Member) from Lalitpur District. On 26 September 2007 Bhattarai declared that he broke relations with the Nepali Congress; the day after the two factions had reunited. Bhattarai's decision was motivated by the move towards republicanism by the unified Nepali Congress.

Death
Bhattarai died at Norvic International Hospital, Kathmandu on 4 March 2011. He was the last surviving founding leader of Nepali Congress. The hospital reported that he died at 11:26 pm. Bhattarai had been in critical care unit at the hospital for three weeks. He was suffering from chronic bronchitis, chronic renal failure and congestive heart failure and died after having recently said that he would live to be one hundred years old.

Awards
Nepal Ratna Awards from the President of Nepal on 2021 (posthumously)

See also
Bhattarai Interim Cabinet,1990

References

External links
 Website of Nepali Congress Party
 Facebook R.I.P. Page

1924 births
2011 deaths
Deaths from multiple organ failure
Nepali Congress politicians from Bagmati Province
Prime ministers of Nepal
Nepalese journalists
Nepalese Hindus
Bahun
Indian emigrants to Nepal
Foreign Ministers of Nepal
Nepal MPs 1999–2002
People of the Nepalese Civil War
20th-century prime ministers of Nepal
Nepalese political party founders
Khas people
Speakers of the House of Representatives (Nepal)